36th Street is an NJ Transit station on the River Line light rail system, located off 36th Street and River Road in the Delaware Gardens neighborhood of Pennsauken Township, in Camden County, New Jersey, United States. It is situated north of Pavonia Yard at the city line with Camden, and as such is the southernmost station of three along the River Line within Pennsauken.

The station opened on March 15, 2004. Southbound service from the station is available to the Walter Rand Transportation Center, with transfer available to the PATCO Speedline, and the Camden Waterfront. Northbound service is available to the Pennsauken Transit Center with connection to Atlantic City via the Atlantic City Line and Trenton Transit Center with connections to New Jersey Transit trains to Newark Penn Station, New York Penn Station, SEPTA trains to Philadelphia, and Amtrak trains.

Transfers
NJ Transit buses: 452

References 

River Line stations
Pennsauken Township, New Jersey
Railway stations in the United States opened in 2004
2004 establishments in New Jersey